HMS Bustler was the mercantile Shillelagh, which the Admiralty purchased in January 1782. She was sold in 1788 and returned to mercantile service. In 1793 she became a privateer and made one notable capture. She then became a West Indiaman that the French captured in 1795.

Royal Navy
The Admiralty purchased Shillelagh in January 1782 and she underwent fitting at Plymouth between February and June. In March Commander Samuel Cox commissioned her for the Channel. He paid her off in August. She underwent coppering and conversion to a brig between July and December. In November Commander Robert Burton commissioned Bustler for the Irish Sea. She then served out of Holyhead, on Anglesey, until she was paid off in May 1786. The Navy sold her at Deptford for £240 on 25 August 1788.

Merchantman
It is obscure what name Bustler sailed under, who her owners were, or what her trade was between 1788 and 1793.

Still, Captain Henry Passmore acquired a letter of marque on 4 March 1793 for Bustler. Bustler captured  in September 1793, and sent her into Dartmouth. , Mitchell, master, prize to Bustler, arrived at Gravesend on 21 October 1793.

Captain Stephen Thomas acquired a letter of marque on 8 March 1794. This letter Thomas stated that Bustlers crew was 20 men. The reduction indicated that she was no longer engaged in privateering as she would not have enough men for prize crews on captures.

Captain Thomas sailed for San Domingo on 11 April. Lloyd's List reported in July 1795 that a French privateer or privateers had captured Bustler, of London, as well as a number of other merchantmen, and taken them into Aux Cayes.

Citations

References
 
 

1782 ships
Age of Sail merchant ships of England
Cutters of the Royal Navy
Brigs of the Royal Navy
Privateer ships of Great Britain
Captured ships